Moulds is a surname. Notable people with the surname include:

 Christopher Moulds is an English conductor 
 Eric Moulds (born 1973), former American footballer
 George Moulds (born 1983), English cricketer
 Air Commodore Gordon Moulds, former Commander of Kandahar Airfield, Afghanistan

See also
Mould (surname)